Pitcairnia breedlovei is a plant species in the genus Pitcairnia. This species is native to Mexico.

References

breedlovei
Flora of Mexico